The Ishibashi Cabinet is the 55th Cabinet of Japan headed by Tanzan Ishibashi from December 23, 1956, to February 25, 1957.

Cabinet

References 

Cabinet of Japan
1956 establishments in Japan
Cabinets established in 1956
Cabinets disestablished in 1957